WDPX-TV (channel 58) is a television station licensed to Woburn, Massachusetts, United States, broadcasting the digital multicast network Grit to the Boston area. It is owned and operated by the Ion Media subsidiary of the E. W. Scripps Company alongside Ion Television station WBPX-TV, channel 68 (and its Concord, New Hampshire–licensed full-time satellite WPXG-TV, channel 21). WDPX-TV and WBPX-TV share studios on Soldiers Field Road in Boston's Allston neighborhood; through a channel sharing agreement, the two stations transmit using WBPX-TV's spectrum from a tower on Parmenter Road in Hudson, Massachusetts.

History
Channel 58 first signed on January 16, 1984 as 12,000-watt W58AO, a low-power station owned by Cape Cod Broadcasting and originally licensed to Vineyard Haven, Massachusetts, with studio facilities in Hyannis.

After temporarily going dark for one week a year-and-a-half later, channel 58 would relaunch on July 19, 1985, as full-power independent station WCVX, now transmitting at a powerful 1.2 million watts, on a par with that of Boston-area independents WSBK-TV and WLVI-TV. Its lineup featured a mixture of vintage reruns, old movies, several half-hour feeds of CNN Headline News, a few first-run syndicated shows and some locally produced programming, including a twice-nightly newscast. However, it suffered early on due to lack of cable coverage, as the Supreme Court had struck down the Federal Communications Commission (FCC)'s must-carry rule on the very day WCVX launched, thus knocking it out of the 60% of homes in the Cape Cod region relying on cable television. Despite this early hurdle, however, area cable systems gradually began adding WCVX to their lineups, and by August 1987, it was carried by every provider on Cape Cod.

In spite of achieving the necessary cable carriage, WCVX was still ailing financially, and by late 1987, Cape Cod Broadcasting president Don Moore was forced to turn the station over to Sentry Federal Savings Bank, which chose Dan Carney to take over daily operations the following January. While viewership increased under Carney's tenure, WCVX continued to lose money, and after laying off nearly 85% of staffers just two years later, Sentry attempted to find a new owner for the struggling station. At one point, Sentry entered into negotiations with the owners of WNAC-TV in Providence, Rhode Island about possibly acquiring WCVX as a satellite station, but the deal collapsed after it was decided by WNAC management that any resulting boost would be minimal at best, especially considering that Cape Cod's aforementioned widespread cable penetration (which had increased to nearly 100% by late 1990, when the talks took place) meant that the Boston and Providence stations were already easily viewable there. Unable to find another willing buyer, Sentry decided to shut down WCVX, and the station went dark in the early hours of July 2, 1991, following an airing of the 1955 film Kentucky Rifle.

Three years after its demise, in 1994, Boston University bought the license and relaunched the station as WZBU, a Cape Cod satellite of Boston's WABU, channel 68 (along with WNBU in Concord, New Hampshire).

In 1999, Paxson Communications (the forerunner to Ion Media Networks) bought WABU, WZBU and WNBU, immediately turning them into part-time affiliates of Pax TV (now Ion Television), while retaining some syndicated programs; the stations' call letters were also respectively changed to WBPX, WDPX and WPXG later that year. Eventually, the syndicated programs were dropped, turning WBPX and its satellites into full-time Pax owned-and-operated stations by 2000.

During the FCC's incentive auction, it was announced that the over-the-air spectrum of WDPX-TV had been sold for $43,467,644; the station indicated that it would enter into a post-auction channel sharing agreement. WDPX-TV now channel-shares with former parent station WBPX-TV; as the WBPX-TV signal no longer reaches Vineyard Haven, WDPX has changed its city of license to Woburn, a western suburb of Boston.

On February 27, 2021, Ion Plus ceased broadcasting. WDPX became a Court TV owned-and-operated station shortly after. On February 25, 2022, WDPX switched its affiliation to Grit.

Subchannel

See also 
 Channel 58 virtual TV stations in the United States
 Channel 22 digital TV stations in the United States
 List of television stations in Massachusetts

References

External links 

Television channels and stations established in 1985
1985 establishments in Massachusetts
DPX-TV
Woburn, Massachusetts
Grit (TV network) affiliates
E. W. Scripps Company television stations